Louis Schubart (9 April 1885 – 23 November 1954) was a French footballer. He competed in the men's tournament at the 1908 Summer Olympics.

References

External links
 

1885 births
1954 deaths
French footballers
France international footballers
Olympic footballers of France
Footballers at the 1908 Summer Olympics
Footballers from Lille
Association football midfielders